Pavlovsky District is the name of several administrative and municipal districts in Russia. The district names are generally related to or derived from the male first name Pavel.

Districts of the federal subjects

Pavlovsky District, Altai Krai, an administrative and municipal district of Altai Krai
Pavlovsky District, Krasnodar Krai, an administrative and municipal district of Krasnodar Krai
Pavlovsky District, Nizhny Novgorod Oblast, an administrative and municipal district of Nizhny Novgorod Oblast
Pavlovsky District, Ulyanovsk Oblast, an administrative and municipal district of Ulyanovsk Oblast
Pavlovsky District, Voronezh Oblast, an administrative and municipal district in Voronezh Oblast

Historical districts
Pavlovsky District, Leningrad Oblast (1938–1953), a former district of Leningrad Oblast (known as Slutsky District in 1938–1944)
Pavlovsky District, Saint Petersburg, a former district of Saint Petersburg, merged into Pushkinsky District in 2005

See also
Pavlovsk (disambiguation)
Pavlov (disambiguation)

References